Kaszewy Dworne  is a village in the administrative district of Gmina Krzyżanów, within Kutno County, Łódź Voivodeship, in central Poland.

References

Kaszewy Dworne